Cleophis (Sanskrit: Kripa ) was an Assacani ruler and key figure in the war between the Assacani people and Alexander the Great.  Cleophis was the mother of Assacanus, the Assacanis' war-leader at the time of Alexander's invasion in 326 BCE. After her son's death in battle, Cleophis assumed command and negotiated a settlement that allowed her to retain her status. Later accounts claim Cleophis had a son by Alexander, a notion dismissed by historians.

The Assacani (called Ashvakas in Sanskrit, from the word Ashva, meaning "horse") were an independent people who lived in parts of what is now the Swat and Buner valleys in modern-day Pakistan. These highlanders were rebellious, fiercely independent clans who resisted subjugation.

Alexander's war with the Assacani
In 326 BCE, Alexander's campaigns west of the Indus River brought him into conflict with the Assacani. In defence of their homeland, they assembled an army of 20,000 cavalry, 38,000 infantry, and 30 elephants, according to classical writer Quintus Curtius Rufus. Their army included a contingent of 7,000 Kamboj mercenaries recruited from Abhisara. 

After being defeated in the field, the Assacani fell back to the fortified city of Massaga, where the fighting continued for five days (or nine days, according to Curtius.) It was during this battle that Assacanus was killed. After her son's death, Cleophis assumed command, mustered the Assacani women to fight, and led the continued defence of the city.  

Eventually, however, Cleophis judged that defeat was inevitable. She came to terms with the invaders and abandoned Massaga with her followers. Diodorus Siculus says: "Cleophis sent precious gifts to Alexander with a message in which she expressed her appreciation of Alexander's greatness and assured him that she would comply with the terms of the treaty."  According to Curtius and Arrian, Cleophis was captured along with her young granddaughter. 

Alexander's retaliation against the defeated Assaceni was severe.  He had Massaga burned.  Victor Hansen writes: "After promising the surrounded Assaceni their lives upon capitulation, he executed all their soldiers who had surrendered. Their strongholds at Ora and Aornus, were also likewise stormed. Garrisons were probably all slaughtered."

Additionally, Alexander pursued the Kamboj mercenaries, surrounded them on a hill, and killed them all. Diodorus describes the event in detail: "...The women, taking up the arms of the fallen, fought side by side with their men. Accordingly, some who had supplied themselves with arms did their best to cover their husbands with their shields, while others, who were without arms, did much to impede the enemy by flinging themselves upon them and catching hold of their shields."

Cleophis and Alexander
Later classical writers, including Curtius and Justin, claim that Alexander fathered a child with Cleophis. Historians dismiss this notion as a much later romantic invention. On Alexander's relatively generous terms, which allowed Cleophis to retain her status, Curtius says, "...some believed that this indulgent treatment was accorded rather to the charms of her person than to pity for her misfortunes. At all events, afterwards she gave birth to a son who received the name Alexander whoever his father may have been..." Earlier writers do not mention this.

See also
 Porus
 Abisares
 Taxiles

References

Books and magazines
 Historie du bouddhisme Indien, Dr E. Lammotte
 Alexander the Great, 2003 - Cambridge University Press, W. W. Tarn
 Political History of Ancient India, 1996, Dr H. C. Raychaudhury
 The Invasion Of India By Alexander The Great As Described By Arrian, Q. Curtius, Diodorus, Plutarch And Justin, J. W. McCrindle
 Envy of the Gods: Alexander the Great's Ill-fated Journey Across Asia, John Prevas
 Carnage and Culture: Landmark Battles in the Rise to Western Power, Victor Hanson
 Alexander: A History of the Origin and Growth of the Art of War from the Earliest Times to the Battle of Ipsus, 301 Bc, With a Detailed Account of the Campaigns, 1996- Da Capo Press, Theodore Ayrault Dodge
 Alexander the Great in Fact and Fiction, 2002 - Oxford University Press, USA, A. B. Bosworth and E. J. Baynham
 The Wars of Alexander the Great, 2002- Osprey Publishing, Waldemar Heckel
 Classical Accounts of India, J. W. McCrindle
 History and Culture of Indian People, The Age of Imperial Unity, Dr R. C. Majumdar, Dr A. D. Pusalkar
 Ancient India, 2003, Dr V. D. Mahajan
 Problems of Ancient India, 2000, K. D. Sethna
 The Pathan., 1967, Olaf Caroe
 Historical Essays, Second Series, 3rd edition, Edward A. Freeman, M. A., HON. D. C. L. & LL.D., Regius Professor of Modern History in the University of Oxford, London Macmillan and Co. And New York,1892
 Alexander the Great, 2003, Dr W. W. Tarn
 Studies in Indian History and Civilization, Dr Buddha Parkash
 Ancient Kamboja, People and the Country, 1981, Dr J. L. Kamboj
 Hindu Polity, A constitutional History of India in Hindu Times, 1978, p 140, 121, Dr K. P. Jayswal

External links
 Krateros (Editor), Article Cleophis in ancientlibrary.com 2005.

Indian female royalty
Indian warriors
Indian women in war
Ancient history of Afghanistan
Mistresses of Alexander the Great
Women in Hellenistic warfare
4th-century BC Indian people
4th-century BC women
Year of birth unknown
Year of death unknown
History of Pakistan